Acarí is a town in the Arequipa region of Peru. The town was near the epicenter of a magnitude 7.1 earthquake on January 14, 2018.

References

Populated places in Peru